Royal Armed Forces may refer to:

Royal Brunei Armed Forces
Royal Burmese Armed Forces
Royal Cambodian Armed Forces
Royal Moroccan Armed Forces
Royal Thai Armed Forces